Congothrissa gossei, or the smooth-belly pellonuline, is a herring relative that occurs in the Congo River system of Africa.  It is the only member of its genus.

References

Clupeidae
Fish described in 1964
Taxa named by Max Poll
Monotypic fish genera
Monotypic freshwater fish genera
Monotypic ray-finned fish genera